Óláfr III, in Old Norse, may refer to the original-spelling names of:

 Amlaíb mac Gofraid (died 941)
 Olof Skötkonung III of Sweden (980–1022)
 Olaf III of Norway (c. 1050–1093)